Vasanti Muzumdar (Devanagari: वासंती मुझुमदार) (1939–2003) was a Marathi writer from Maharashtra, India.

She was born in 1939 in Karad, Maharashtra.

She studied at Fergusson College in Pune to obtain a bachelor's degree from Pune University and obtained a master's degree from SNDT Women's University.

Muzumdar played an important role in founding the institution Granthali (ग्रंथाली) aimed at publishing books and spreading knowledge in Maharashtra via different means.

Literary work

Collections of poems
 Sahela Re (सहेला रे)
 Sanehi (सनेही)

Collections of essays
 Nadikathi (नदीकाठी)
 Jhalal (झळाळ)

Awards and honours
Muzumdar's works received Damani Puraskar (दमाणी पुरस्कार), Sane Guruji Puraskar (सानेगुरुजी पुरस्कार), Bahinabai Chaudhari  Puraskar (बहिणाबाई चौधरी पुरस्कार), and a few Maharashtra state literary awards.

1939 births
2003 deaths
Muzumdar, Vasanti
SNDT Women's University alumni
People from Satara district
Indian women poets
20th-century Indian poets
Indian women essayists
20th-century Indian essayists
Women writers from Maharashtra
20th-century women writers
20th-century Indian women
20th-century Indian people